Argüelles is an administrative neighborhood of Madrid belonging to the district of Moncloa-Aravaca. As of 1 July 2019, it had a population of  inhabitants. It is 0,755758 km2 in total area.

History 
The neighbourhood bears the name of Agustín Argüelles, the legal guardian of Queen Isabella II. The first streets were chiefly named after influential members of the Royal Court. Planned in the mid 19th century, its urbanization started by 1856, on plots part of the Príncipe Pío hill.

References

Bibliography 
  
 
 

Wards of Madrid
Moncloa-Aravaca